Claude Mollet (ca. 1564 – shortly before 1649), premier jardinier du Roy — first gardener to three French kings, Henri IV, Louis XIII and the young Louis XIV   — was a member of the Mollet dynasty of French garden designers in the seventeenth century. His father was Jacques Mollet, gardener at the château d'Anet, where Italian formal gardening was introduced to France and where Claude apprenticed, and his son was André Mollet, who took the French style to Holland, Sweden and England.

In the woodcuts in Olivier de Serres' work dedicated to Henri IV,  (Paris 1600), the plans laid out in royal gardens are by Claude Mollet, who was a friend of the author, who praises Mollet's designs for the herbs and shrubs speaking in letters, devices, cyphers, coats-of-arms, frames, ships and other things, imitated with marvelous industry and patience.

As de Serres did, Mollet maintained two tree nurseries, in the outskirts of the Faubourg Saint-Honoré, west of Paris.

Mollet's volume Théâtre des plans et jardinages, which contains autobiographical information, was published by his son in 1652, after his death. The manuscript was written many years before, about 1613–15, and revised over the years. A handsome calligraphic copy now at Dumbarton Oaks was dedicated to Louis XIII shortly before the king's death (1643).In it he acknowledged the influence upon him of Étienne Dupérac, the architect of Saint Germain-en-Laye.

Mollet states that Henri IV commissioned him to lay out the terraces at the new château of Saint Germain-en-Laye in 1595 and thereafter at Château de Fontainebleau, and at Montceaux-en-Brie as well as at the Tuileries, where he was in charge throughout his active career (Karling, p. 7) and where the central garden axis that he remade after depredations by soldiers in 1593 has been extended far to the west, as the axe historique of Paris.

Notes

External links
Online version of André Mollet's "Le jardin de plaisir"

References
Sten Karling, "The importance of André Mollet", in The French Formal Garden, 1974. Elizabeth B. MacDougall and F. Hamilton Hazlehurst, editors (Dumbarton Oaks) This is the basis for the information in this article.

17th-century French writers
17th-century French male writers
French didactic writers
French astrological writers
French garden writers
French Baroque garden designers
1560s births
17th-century deaths
Members of the Académie royale d'architecture
French male non-fiction writers
Architects from Versailles